Channa harcourtbutleri, the  Burmese snakehead, is a species of snakehead endemic to Inle Lake and surroundings in Myanmar. Locally called nga ohn-ma, among aquarists it is considered one of the dwarf snakeheads, but no significant import for aquarists is known. The specific name honors Sir Harcourt Butler, a British governor in the region.

This was for a long time considered to be a junior synonym of Channa gachua. In fact, both species closely resemble each other. The article on its revalidation only mentions three discriminating features, such as the missing ocellus in the dorsal fin of a juvenile Channa harcourtbutleri. It is suspected to be a mouthbrooder and eats a wide range of foods, including arthropods and small fish, but unlike in some relatives, no frogs.

References

Sources

External links

 
 snakeheads.org

harcourtbutleri
Fish described in 1918
Taxa named by Nelson Annandale